Paravur Kayal is a lake in Paravur, Kollam district, Kerala, India. Although it is small, with an area of only 6.62 km², it is the end point of the Ithikkara River and part of the system of lakes and canals that make up the Kerala Backwaters. It has been connected to Edava and Ashtamudi Kayal as part of the Trivandrum - Shoranur canal system since the late 19th century.

Importance of Paravur Lake

The lake meets the sea and in between a small stretch of road which divides them can be viewed on way. Paravur Lake is one of the emerging tourist destinations in the district which attracts a good number of tourists.

The panoramic views are breath taking if you opt for a birds eye view, not from the sky but from the mountain terraces situated north and east of the place. Famous Lakesagar Xavier's resort is situated at the banks of Paravur lake. Priyadarshini boat club is another major attraction in the vicinity of Paravur lake. The mangroves along both sides of Paravur lake is also very famous

How to reach

Paravur-Edava-Varkala road passes through the banks of Paravur lake. The nearest important railway station to Paravur lake is Paravur railway station. Fourteen pairs of trains stop at Paravur railway station every day. The nearest KSRTC bus station is Chathannoor bus station, which is 12 km away.

See also

 Paravur
 Paravur Thekkumbhagam
 Paravur railway station
 Pozhikara
 Nedungolam

References

Lakes of Kollam
Geography of Kollam district